Rowland Atkinson is a British academic, urban sociologist, and author.

Career
He directed the Housing and Community Research Unit at the University of Tasmania from 2005 to 2008. In 2009, he became a Reader in Urban Studies and Criminology at the University of York. He has been working as a Research Chair in Inclusive Societies at the University of Sheffield since 2014.

Atkinson writes about the changing urban landscape, often criticizing policies that benefit the super-rich at the expense of low and middle-income earners. In response to the fear that the wealthiest would go abroad in case of a policy change targeted to reconcile the poorest within the City of London, he once wrote: "I have come to realise that one of the very last places the rich would leave is this fine city."

As an academic, he is the author and co-author of more than two hundred research papers in the fields of urban studies, housing studies, and criminology.

Bibliography
"Alpha City: How the Super-Rich Captured London" By Rowland Atkinson (2020) 
"Building better societies: Promoting social justice in a world falling apart" By Rowland Atkinson, Lisa Mckenzie, and Simon Winlow. (2017) 
"Domestic Fortress: Fear and the New Home Front" By Rowland Atkinson, and Sarah Blandy. (2016)

References 

Year of birth missing (living people)
Living people
Urban sociologists
Academics of the University of York
British sociologists
Academics of the University of Sheffield